il Giornale is an Italian language daily newspaper published in Milan, Italy.

History and profile
The newspaper was founded in 1974 by the journalist Indro Montanelli, together with the colleagues Enzo Bettiza, Ferenc Fejtő, Raymond Aron and others, after some disagreements with the new pro-left editorial line adopted by the newspaper Corriere della Sera, where Montanelli had been one of the most important contributors. Montanelli left Corriere della Sera in 1973. The newspaper was first published on 25 June 1974 as il Giornale nuovo, with Indro Montanelli as editor and member of the publishing company board of directors and an editorial office composed of 59 journalists. The paper has a conservative stance. The paper's headquarters is in Milan. In 1977 Montanelli, in financial difficulties, accepted an offer by Silvio Berlusconi, who thus became the new owner. In 1983 the paper was renamed as il Giornale. When Berlusconi entered politics in December 1993, however, Montanelli left fearing for his own independence, and went on to found the short-lived daily newspaper La Voce.

In 1992, Berlusconi left the role of the owner of il Giornale to his brother Paolo. Vittorio Feltri replaced Indro Montanelli as editor. , the publisher of the newspaper, Società Europea di Edizioni, was owned by Paolo (58.3%) and Mondadori Editori (41.7% directly and indirectly). The paper was published in broadsheet format until May 2005 when it switched to tabloid format. In May 2005 il Giornale started its online version. In 2007 the monthly business magazine Espansione became a supplement of the paper. As of 2016, Società Europea di Edizioni was still partially owned by Arnoldo Mondadori Editore directly for 36.90%, which is a listed company that majority owned by Fininvest. It was reported that Roberto Amodei, the owner of several sports newspaper of Italy, had interested to subscribe the capital increase of Società Europea di Edizioni.

Circulation
il Giornale was the seventh best-selling Italian newspaper in 1997 with a circulation of 218,741 copies. The paper had a circulation of 235,000 copies in 2000. The circulation of the paper was 228,198 copies in 2001 and it was 219,363 copies in 2002. The circulation of the paper was 216,000 copies in 2003 and 208,407 copies in 2004. In 2008 the paper had an average circulation of 192,667 copies. The circulation of the paper was 184,882 copies in 2009 and 183,923 copies in 2010. In 2012 il Giornale sold 79,125,210 copies.

Il Giornale della Libertà
Il Giornale della Libertà was a free weekly political, headed by Michela Vittoria Brambilla, and attached to Il Giornale, but was severely criticized by its editorial staff, who later went on strike (for the second time after the departure of Indro Montanelli).

The last issue is still available from the Internet Archive.

Editors
Indro Montanelli (1974–1994)
Vittorio Feltri (1994–1997)
Mario Cervi (1997–2000)
Maurizio Belpietro (2000–2007)
Mario Giordano (2007–2009)
Vittorio Feltri (2009–2010)
Alessandro Sallusti (2010–2021)
Augusto Minzolini (2021-present)

See also 

 List of newspapers in Italy
 il Giornale: namesake American coffeeshop, predecessor to Starbucks

Notes

External links
il Giornale Official Website 

1974 establishments in Italy
Conservatism in Italy
Berlusconi family
Italian-language newspapers
Publications established in 1974
Newspapers published in Milan
Daily newspapers published in Italy